Eliza Białkowska (born 19 July 1973) is a retired Polish rhythmic gymnast.

She competed for Poland in the rhythmic gymnastics all-around competition at two Olympic Games: in 1988 in Seoul and in 1992 in Barcelona. In 1988 she was 14th overall, in 1992 15th.

References

External links 
 Eliza Białkowska at Sports-Reference.com

1973 births
Living people
Polish rhythmic gymnasts
Gymnasts at the 1988 Summer Olympics
Gymnasts at the 1992 Summer Olympics
Olympic gymnasts of Poland
Sportspeople from Lubusz Voivodeship
People from Skwierzyna